The Allegheny High School in Pittsburgh, Pennsylvania is a building from 1904. It was listed on the National Register of Historic Places in 1986. Notable graduates include William N. Robson, award-winning writer, director, and producer from the old-time radio era and Dorothy Mae Richardson, an African American community activist whose work was essential to the founding of the Neighborhood Reinvestment Corporation.

American novelist Willa Cather taught English and Latin at Allegheny High School, where she came to head the English department.

The building is now the Pittsburgh Allegheny 6-8, a magnet school located in the North Side.

References

External links
 Pittsburgh Allegheny 6-8

School buildings on the National Register of Historic Places in Pennsylvania
Neoclassical architecture in Pennsylvania
School buildings completed in 1904
Middle schools in Pittsburgh
City of Pittsburgh historic designations
Pittsburgh History & Landmarks Foundation Historic Landmarks
Defunct schools in Pennsylvania
1904 establishments in Pennsylvania
National Register of Historic Places in Pittsburgh